List of English words of Scottish origin may refer to:

List of English words of Scots origin (i.e. Lowland Scots (Lallans, Doric etc.))
List of English words of Scottish Gaelic origin